Camponotus elegans is a species of carpenter ants found in South East Queensland and Western Australia.

See also 
 List of Camponotus species
 List of ants of Australia

References

External links 

 Camponotus elegans at insectoid.info
 Camponotus elegans at antwiki
 Camponotus elegans at antweb
 Camponotus elegans at antcat

elegans
Insects described in 1902
Hymenoptera of Australia
Insects of Queensland
Arthropods of Western Australia